HMS Arethusa was the name ship of her class of light cruisers built for the Royal Navy. She was built by Chatham Dockyard, with the keel being laid down on 25 January 1933. She was launched on 6 March 1934, and commissioned 21 May 1935 by Captain Philip Vian.

History

Arethusa was assigned to the 3rd Cruiser Squadron in the Mediterranean on completion and was still there at the onset of World War II in September 1939. However, early in 1940 she and her sister  were recalled to the Home Fleet, where they formed the 2nd Cruiser Squadron with the remainder of the class. She participated in the Norwegian Campaign in April 1940, but on 8 May she joined the Nore Command, where she supported the defending forces in Calais and later aided the evacuations from French Atlantic ports.

On 28 June 1940 she was a component of the newly formed Force "H" at Gibraltar, with which she participated in the action against Vichy French forces at Mers el Kebir in July 1940. With Force "H" she took part in convoy protection patrols in the Atlantic and operated in the Mediterranean.

Towards the end of 1941 she returned to home waters and took part in the Lofoten raid in December, where she was damaged by near misses. After refit and repair at Chatham until April 1942, she returned to the Mediterranean in June 1942, where she joined the 15th Cruiser Squadron, operating mostly in support of the resupply of Malta.

While on Operation Stoneage, a torpedo from an Italian aircraft struck Arethusa on 18 November 1942 and caused heavy casualties. She received temporary repair work in Alexandria that lasted until 7 February 1943, after which she proceeded to Charleston Navy Yard, Charleston, South Carolina, United States, for full repair. These were completed by 15 December 1943, and the ship then returned to Britain.

In 1941 Arethusa had been adopted by the people of the City of Swansea. A memorial relief to the 156 men killed in the November 1942 aircraft attack can still be viewed in the city's Maritime Quarter.  Swansea Museum's reserve collection at its Landore facility contains the ship's badge, a 20mm Oerlikon AA gun salvaged from the Newport scrapyard, and a scale model of the ship.

She did not become fully operational again until early June 1944, when she sailed for the invasion of Normandy, forming part of Force "D" off Sword Beach. She had the honor of carrying King George VI across the channel to Normandy, when he toured the beaches and visited the Allied command headquarters.
On 24 June she came under air attack in Seine Bay and sustained some damage.
On 25 June a magnetic mine detonated in her wake. The shock damage was fairly extensive, the cruiser went to Portsmouth for repairs then to a commercial yard for yet another refit and did not return to service until September.

By January 1945, she was part of the 15th Cruiser Squadron with the Mediterranean Fleet and stayed there until October 1945 when she returned to the United Kingdom and was immediately placed in the reserve (at the Nore).

There was a tentative plan to sell her to the Royal Norwegian Navy in 1946 but this came to nothing and she was placed in category 'B' reserve. Because the Navy considered her class of ships too small to be worth modernising, the Navy used Arethusa for trials and experiments in 1949 before allocating her to BISCO for disposal. On 9 May 1950, she arrived at Cashmore's, Newport, for breaking up.

Notes

Footnotes

References

Further reading
S.V. Patyanin (С.В.Патянин), Kreysera tipa Arethusa (Крейсера типа «Аретьюза»), series Morskaya Kollektsya 6/2002 (in Russian)

External links
 
HMS Arethusa at Uboat.net

 

Arethusa-class cruisers (1934)
Ships built in Chatham
1934 ships
World War II cruisers of the United Kingdom